The Unwritten is an American comic book written by Mike Carey with art by Peter Gross. Published by the Vertigo imprint of DC Comics, the book follows Tom Taylor, who was the inspiration for a series of hugely successful children's fantasy novels in the vein of Harry Potter.  The series deals with themes related to fame, celebrity, and the relationship between fiction and human consciousness.

Inspiration
Mike Carey, in an interview with Nicholas Yanes from scifipulse.net, claimed that "the most important reference point is the autobiography of Christopher Milne – who is famous as the Christopher Robin of the Winnie the Pooh books. Milne grew up feeling that his father had stolen his childhood from him, turned a profit from it and then given it back to him in a form he couldn't use. Our Tom is very much in that situation when we first meet him, although we take his identity crisis a fair bit further than that".

Collected editions
The series is being collected into trade paperbacks:

Additionally, Vertigo released in September 2013 an original graphic novel called The Unwritten: Tommy Taylor and the Ship that Sank Twice (hardcover), a standalone story about the origin of Tommy Taylor and his powers.

The story of Tommy Taylor continues in the 12 issue series (also titled Volume 2) of The Unwritten: Apocalypse, started in January 2014 (compiled in collected Volumes 10 and 11).

The Unwritten is also being released in deluxe hardcover editions.

Reception
IGN gave the first three issues 8.5, 9.0 and 9.0 out of 10 respectively.

References

External links
Solicitation for The Unwritten #1

Fantasy comics
Comics by Mike Carey (writer)